The Revolutionary Inhabitants Organization marxist-leninists (in Danish: Den revolutionære Boligorganisation marxister-leninister, BOm-l) was a Maoist group that surged amongst the house squatters' milieu in Denmark in March 1972. BOm-l was headed by a Central Committee. BOm-l published BOml bulletin.

BOm-l and the Communist League Marxist-Leninists (KFML) had similar viewpoints. Discussions between the two groups were initiated, and BOm-l declared that they were ready to accept the political leadership of KFML. BOm-l was to become a 'sectoral organization' of KFML. This sparked new enthusiasm within KFML. However the cultural differences between the theoretical-ideological KFML and the "activist" BOm-l proved to be too large, and the two organizations quickly went from allies to rivals. 

The split was final when BOm-l reconstituted itself as the Marxist–Leninist Unity League (Marxistisk-Leninistisk Enhedsforbund MLE) in February 1973. MLE and KFML had almost identical programs and both searched recognition by the same foreign parties, such as AKP(ml) (Norway) and KFML (Sweden). MLE published Tjen Folket.

MLE declared itself to be "a communist, Marxist-Leninist organization that puts as its goal the armed, socialist revolution and the construction of the dictatorship of the proletariat in Denmark".

MLE struggled actively against Danish membership in the European Economic Community. However, MLE distanced itself from the main anti-EEC movement, the Popular Movement. Instead MLE launched its own anti-EEC front, the Workers Committees against EEC (Arbejderkomiteerne mod EEC).

In 1974 there was a split in MLE, and about 50% of its members joined KFML. In 1975 MLE was dissolved and the majority of its remaining cadre joined KFML.

1972 establishments in Denmark
1975 disestablishments in Denmark
Defunct communist parties in Denmark
Political parties established in 1972
Political parties disestablished in 1975